The Tonghua incident was a mass killing of rebelling Japanese soldiers that occurred on 3 February 1946 in southern Jilin, China.

Background
Tonghua, being the local transport hub, had a large influx of refugees in 1945. The first instance of violence (a ) was reported 13 August 1945, when a train, filled with civilian Japanese refugees, was stopped at an elevated track near the tunnel entrance, and the Japanese women were gang-raped by the locals after the train security guards were killed. The train was unintentionally stopped by Chinese guerilla forces attempting to intercept the preceding evacuation train of the family of the last Chinese Emperor (Puyi), most notably Empress Wanrong. The incident involved children being killed by being thrown from windows, over 100 Japanese women committing suicide by jumping from a nearby cliff, and a mob shooting anyone who tried to escape. The rest of passengers were rescued when a battalion of the Imperial Japanese Army, alerted by the sole girl to escape, arrived the next morning. Many of the survivors of the Shosankoku incident would become the inhabitants of the Tonghua refugee camp, later falling victim to the Tonghua incident.

Following the surrender of Japan, the local refugee camp was filled by 17,000 Japanese locals and over 100,000 Japanese civilians fleeing from various regions of China. Although, according to the Sino-Soviet Treaty of Friendship and Alliance, Soviet support of the Communist Party of China (CPC) in Soviet-dominated areas was forbidden, the Democratic North-East Army was a de facto affiliate of the communist Eighth Route Army.

Tensions heightened in late August 1945 when groups of Soviet soldiers repeatedly raided Tonghua Girl's High School, raping, abducting, and killing both students and teachers. At least one shootout with a teacher possessing a concealed pistol was also reported, leading to additional raids. Participation of the male teachers in the rapes was also reported.

The gang rapes reportedly happened even in broad daylight on the streets, and at least one Soviet officer was shot dead while trying to stop his fellow soldiers. Japanese refugees responded mainly by shaving the women's heads bald, applying dirt and grease to their skin, and wearing storage bags instead of normal clothes.

In September 1946, a general withdrawal of the Soviet occupation forces was in progress. As the CPC sought to control the region to undermine Kuomintang positions, mass killings were underway, with approximately 70,000 people killed across Manchuria by March 1946. One of the organizations helping the CPC to dismantle existing civilian infrastructure (both the residual Japanese and Kuomintang) was the  detachment, staffed mostly by ethnic Koreans, many of whom were former members of the Imperial Japanese Army. That detachment was known for particularly poor discipline when compared to the regular CPC units.

On 22 September 1945, the CPC-affiliated forces evicted Kuomintang forces from Tonghua. By 2 November, the CPC positions in the city had consolidated enough that a red flag was raised over the city headquarters.

In early November 1945, all property owned by those of Japanese ancestry was confiscated and all Japanese males aged 15 to 60 were forced to join labor teams. From 17 November, Chinese Communist forces were arbitrarily raiding Japanese homes in search of weapons and drafting those they came across into labor teams, regardless of gender or age. Forced eviction of Japanese people from their dwellings also began.

From 10 December, some of the former Japanese soldiers were recruited into the CPC's newly created aircraft squadron to help the Chinese master the captured Japanese airplanes. It was the part of ruse de guerre intended to transmit a false image of the Kuomintang still being in control of the city with the help of the former personnel of Kwantung Army. Large-scale collaboration of Japanese units with CPC in the aftermath of the surrender of Japan was not uncommon, most notably among the 47th division of the Imperial Japanese Army.

On 23 December, an event publicizing collaboration between CPC and the Japanese was held.

On 5 January 1946, a Japanese spokesperson in the Tonghua refugee camp, was requested by CPC to give out Japanese armament caches. He was later arrested on 15 January.

By 10 January, the Tonghua branch of the "Japanese People's Liberation Army" was disbanded with 140 Japanese arrested, amid persistent rumors concerning a wide scale rebellion by the Kwantung Army.

On 21 January, further arrests and detentions of Japanese occurred in the aftermath of the murders of a high-ranking Japanese civilian leaders.

The Japanese rebellion
A wave of arrests, interrogation with torture, and executions followed immediately. In particular, all of the Japanese arrested on 10 January were immediately shot. The Ri Koko detachment acted upon this with particular cruelty.

At midnight on 3 February, the Japanese rebellion started according to the agreement with the Kuomintang. Although it was initially planned to be assisted by Kuomintang forces in Shenyang, the radio message postponing the rebellion was not received due to equipment failure. As a result, several hundred Japanese attackers, armed mostly with shovels and clubs, and a small number of swords or rifles, were decimated by machine gun fire from ambush positions, both inside and outside the CPC headquarters. The rebellion on the airfield was thwarted before it started. Out of three rebel attacks, only the attack aimed to take control of Empress Wanrong's apartments in the Public Security building succeeded.

The Public Security building was soon surrounded by CPC reinforcements and shelled. The Japanese rebels, lacking heavy weapons, surrendered.

Aftermath

By the morning of 3 February 1946, all Japanese males aged 16 or older and suspected females, frequently wearing only pajamas, were chained and forced to march  in  weather. Any who fell from exhaustion or wounds were shot dead.

About 3,000 Japanese men and women were put into old warehouses, packed 5 persons per square metre (one person per 2.2 sq ft). Many became hysterical due to the lack of oxygen, but anyone climbing through a window was shot. Soon, the flooring had turned into a pool of blood, and people died on their feet – the corpses could not fall because of extreme crowding. About 2,000 civilians who did not fit into the warehouses were shot nearby.

After 5 days of confinement, the survivors were let to walk out, only to be beaten to death by the Ri Koko detachment guards. The CPC also carried out rapid interrogations and subsequent torture. The people deemed related to the rebellion were shot. Also, many of the Japanese women were raped and/or committed suicide.

, a Kuomintang-appointed governor of the region, was publicly flogged to death by the CPC together with the Japanese rebellion leaders. , the nominal Japanese leader in Tonghua, died on 15 March 1946 in prison due to pneumonia.

Subsequent events
Kuomintang captured Tonghua in late 1946 and held a memorial service to the victims of the rebellion. The city was retaken by the CPC in 1947.

Bibliography

External links 
紙田治一 遺稿【通化事件】  医師・紙田治一の記録
山下好之氏 第4回 8.通化から牡丹江・桂木斯へ撤退 OralHistoryProject
中共空軍創設秘話その3 軍事評論家佐藤守 2005-11-08
中国空軍創設につくした日本人教官元空軍司令官が回想する 『人民中国』

See also 
Allied war crimes during World War II
Nikolayevsk incident
Gegenmiao massacre
Japanese prisoners of war in the Soviet Union
Tungchow mutiny

Chinese Civil War
Occupied Japan
Japan–Korea relations
Massacres committed by China
Massacres in China
Battles involving Korea
Battles involving Japan
Battles involving China
Anti-Japanese sentiment in China
1946 in China
History of Jilin
February 1946 events in Asia
Aftermath of World War II in China
Aftermath of World War II in Japan